Bonifacio di Castel Lotario (died 1504) was a Roman Catholic prelate who served as Bishop of Chiusi (1503–1504).

Biography
On 8 February 1503, Bonifacio di Castel Lotario was appointed during the papacy of Pope Alexander VI as Bishop of Chiusi.
He served as Bishop of Chiusi until his death in 1504.

References

External links and additional sources
 (for Chronology of Bishops) 
 (for Chronology of Bishops) 

16th-century Italian Roman Catholic bishops
Bishops appointed by Pope Alexander VI
1504 deaths
Bishops of Chiusi